Fagasā is a village in the Eastern District of Tutuila Island in American Samoa. The village lies by Fagasa Bay, on the north shore of the island. Its name is Samoan and translates to “Forbidden Bay.” The village borders the Tutuila-section of National Park of American Samoa. The trailhead to Mount ‘Alava is located near the village by Fagasa Pass (on Route 5).

Fagasa has two sub-villages: Fagatele (Big Bay) on the west side, where Le’atele School is located, and Fagale'a on the east side, by the chapel of the Congregational Christian Church in American Samoa (CCCAS).

Forbidden Bay has been claimed to be one of the most beautiful bays in the South Pacific Ocean. It can be reached by boat or from Fagasā by foot.

A porpoise sanctuary is located in Fagasa Bay.

Etymology
The name Fagasa translates to “Sacred Bay.” The village's high chiefs, elders and orators all believe the name derived from the legend of Liava'a.

History
The first European expedition to ever set foot on Tutuila was headed by Frenchman Jean-François de Galaup, comte de Lapérouse, who landed at Fagasa in 1787. This encounter, however, ended tragically. A battle between the French and the Samoans found place in A'asu, where twelve sailors and 39 Samoans were killed. On December 10, 1787, two French parties arrived at Tutuila. One under Lapérouse landed at Fagasa, while the other, under M. DeLangle, landed at A’asu a few miles to the west. In Fagasa, Lapérouse discovered a little bay and a sizable village, which was walled off from the rest of Tutuila Island by mountains. Lapérouse and his party were welcomed in the village and also permitted to take water from the two streams flowing through the village.

In 1836, a group of five British London Missionary Society (LMS) missionaries, accompanied by their wives, anchored in Fagasa Bay. At Fagasa, reverend Archibald Murray went ashore and asked for the leading authority in the area. He was sent to the High Chief Mauga at Pago Pago. He returned on foot to Fagasa with Pomare, the chief's son, and rejoined his colleagues before setting sails for Upolu Island. The formal Christianization of Tutuila and Manu'a Islands is said to stem from this voyage.

In the early hours of January 11, 1942, a Japanese submarine surfaced near Fagasa and then sent more than a dozen shells over the mountain and onto the vicinity of the Naval Station Tutuila. There was only one direct hit, which was the only Japanese-owned structure in the archipelago (owned by Frank Shimasaki).

In March 1991, a prehistoric adze quarry was discovered at Fagasa and was recognized as a possible major stone tool production site for the region and islands as far away as the Marquesas.

Demographics

Religion
Fagasa's main church is the Congregational Christian Church in American Samoa (CCCAS). It was the first religion to be established in Fagasa. At the end of World War II, villagers decided to construct the first chapel in the village. Although transportation was difficult, the villagers carried materials and supplies over their shoulders from the Mafa Pass and down to Fagasa. The church is located right where the steep winding road ends and the flatland begins.

Geography
Fagasā is situated on the north shore of Tutuila, two miles southwest of Pago Pago. A stream with fales beside it follows the steep valley down to Fagasa. The buses to Fagasa go every hour from the bus station at Fagatogo Market in Pago Pago. Fagasā is located in the Nofoa area of Itū'au ma Nofo County.

Fagasa lies northwest of Pago Pago and is separated from the populated southern shore of Tutuila by a range of high mountains. It is located within a half-moon bay and enclosed by rugged mountain ridges. The road leading to Fagasa is a cut-off to the left from the main road in Pago Pago proper. A 10-minute drive connects Fagasa to the capital. The drive's highest point is the Mafa Pass, an open tunnel where visitors will first see Sacred Bay in Fagasa. Numerous monuments of historical sites have been put up by the American Samoa National Park here, and a walking trail to the Mount ʻAlava Towers takes off from the Mafa.

The soil is rich for vegetation and forests. Families have developed the land near their homes for agricultural crops. Fagasa is surrounded by a mountain range from either end. Surrounding mountains include the Fuaau Ridge, Taumata Mountain, Leele Mountain, and Fatifati Mountain. Leele Stream flows down from Leele Mountain and through the village before discharging into the Pacific Ocean. Another stream, Leua, flows from Fatifati Mountain and down through Fagasa. On clear days, one can see the mountains of Upolu Island over the horizon.

The shoreline from Fagasā Bay to Vatia Bay is within the National Park of American Samoa and contains the longest stretch of undisturbed and uninhabited coast on Tutuila Island. The forest along this coastline has never been disturbed, and steep cliffs are found here along with scenic coves such as Tāfeu Cove near Vatia. There are also waterfalls, streams, and forest-covered ridge tops.

Fagasā Pass
At Fagasā Pass right outside of town is the primary trailhead for the Mount ‘Alava Trail. This 7-mile roundtrip trail leads to a mountain summit with panoramic views of Pago Pago Harbor and surrounding areas of Tutuila Island. The trail goes through dense rainforest in the National Park, home to a variety of tropical bird species and fruit bats. Halfway up the mountain is a coconut- and banana plantation.

National park
The Tutuila unit of the National Park of American Samoa is situated between the villages on Fagasā on the west and Āfono on the east. The southern boundary follows along the crest of the Mount ʻAlava-Maugaloa Ridge above Pago Pago Harbor from Āfono Pass to Fagasā Pass. Access to the Tutuila portion of the park is via the road which runs along the perimeter of the upper Pago Pago Harbor. Lateral roads lead to Fagasa Pass the park's western end. From the Fagasā Pass National Park entrance, there is an unpaved road leaving hikers to the top of Mount ʻAlava. The road was originally constructed in order to service the television transmitters on the mountain. Road signs marking entry points to the National Park can be found near the trailhead at Fagasā Bay, and along the national park side of Fagasā Bay in order to mark the park's boundary from the ridge top down to Siufaga Point.

Jagged Mount ʻAlava dominates the scenery on northern Tutuila Island. A 6-mile roundtrip trail leads up to the 1,585 ft. peak. The view from atop Mount ʻAlava contains both the south and north sides of the island's Pacific coasts as well as the deep inlet in Pago Pago Harbor.

Boat tours arranged by the government regularly sail around the north coast villages of Fagasā, Āfono, and Vatia.

Attractions
World War II relics can be seen on the mountain ridges and shorelines of Fagasa. The American Marines left Fagasa on August 15, 1945, after it was officially declared that the Japanese forces had surrendered to the United States. On the shorelines of Fagafue and Sika, one can still find the pillbox forts or gun turrets the Marines utilized as coastal lookouts during World War II.

There is a marine life sanctuary in Fagasa Bay. Tourists often hike from Mafa Pass to the Mount ʻAlava Towers, which is the main transmitting antennas of the American Samoa Government's TV station.

Notable people
 Fofó Iosefa Fiti Sunia
 Al Noga

References 

 
Tutuila
Villages in American Samoa